Groat Bridge is a bridge that spans the North Saskatchewan River in Edmonton, Alberta, Canada. It is a part of Groat Road. The bridge is composed of two spans that are side by side. The original structure was rehabilitated in 1990 and again in 2020. The 2020 $48 million rehabilitation saw the decks of both spans replaced one side at a time, with the new decks placed on the existing piers. Groat bridge connects the communities of River Valley Mayfair on the south end to River Valley Glenora on the north end.

See also 
 List of crossings of the North Saskatchewan River
 List of bridges in Canada

References

External links
 

Bridges in Edmonton
Bridges completed in 1955
Road bridges in Alberta
1955 establishments in Alberta